Baptiste Pierron (born 8 August 1993) is a French downhill mountain biker. In 2019, he won the European Downhill Championships in Pampilhosa da Serra, Portugal. His younger brother Amaury also competes in downhill racing.

References

External links

Living people
Downhill mountain bikers
1993 births
French male cyclists
French mountain bikers